Statistics of the Scottish Football League in season 2010–11.

Scottish First Division

Play-offs

Semi-finals

Final

Scottish Second Division

Play-offs

Semi-finals

Final

Scottish Third Division

Final

See also
2010–11 in Scottish football

References

 
Scottish Football League seasons